Chilhowee Township is an inactive township in Johnson County, in the U.S. state of Missouri.

Chilhowee Township was established in 1868, taking its name from the community of Chilhowee, Missouri.

References

Townships in Missouri
Townships in Johnson County, Missouri